Zhas Alash is a private opposition Kazakh language newspaper published in Almaty, Kazakhstan.

History and profile
Zhas Alash was established on 22 March 1921. It is a nationalist newspaper named after Zhas Alash movement. The paper is published in Kazakh twice per week, Thursday and Tuesday.

See also
Media of Kazakhstan

References

External links 
Kazakhstan press and newspapers
Zhas Alash Official Website

1921 establishments in Russia
Newspapers established in 1921
Kazakh-language newspapers
Newspapers published in Kazakhstan
Mass media in Almaty